The 2007 Gedling Borough Council election took place on 3 May 2007 to elect members of Gedling Borough Council in Nottinghamshire, England. The whole council was up for election and the Conservative Party gained overall control of the council from no overall control.

Election result
The results saw the Conservatives win a majority on the council, which they had previously shared control of with Labour. The Conservatives took 28 seats, up from 22 before the election. Labour dropped 11 seats to end level with the Liberal Democrats, who gained 2 seats, on 9 councillors. Overall turnout in the election was 40.4%, up from 32.4% in 2003.

One Labour candidate was unopposed at the election.

Ward results

References

2007 English local elections
2007
2000s in Nottinghamshire